Lincoln Cortez Velasquez (born October 27, 1991), better known by his username Cong TV, is a Filipino YouTuber, comedian, musician, vlogger, and online streamer. He is known for his comedy videos on YouTube.

Velasquez is often also considered one of the top YouTube personalities in the Philippines.

Early life 
Lincoln Cortez Velasquez was born on October 27, 1991, to Marlon Velasquez and Jovel Cortez.

Career 
Velasquez began uploading videos to YouTube in 2008. He started out as a vlogger and rose to fame in the Philippines by uploading comedy skits and parodies to the platform. He also played the role of Moby in the 2016 Philippine television series My Super D.

Aside from being a vlogger, he is also a live streamer and a musician. He is the lead vocalist and guitarist of the band Coln, which he formed in 2018. He released his first music video as well in the same year on YouTube. On December 3, 2020, his channel was included and ranked third on the list of the Top YouTube PH Creators of 2020.

Personal life 
Velasquez has three siblings, two of whom are YouTubers as well: Marlon Velasquez Jr., also known as Junnie Boy, Patricia Velasquez, also known as Neneng Lamig, and Venice Velasquez. Both Marlon and Patricia have already surpassed one million subscribers on the aforementioned platform.

In December 2020, he and his girlfriend and fellow vlogger, Viy Cortez, lost their baby just days after learning of their pregnancy. A year later, however, Cortez announced on a vlog that she and Cong TV were expecting another baby. On July 5, 2022, Cortez gave birth to their son, Zeus Emmanuel "Kidlat" Velasquez.

Filmography

Television

Music video

References

External links 
Cong TV on YouTube

1991 births
Living people
Filipino YouTubers
People from Metro Manila
YouTube channels launched in 2008
Vlogs-related YouTube channels
Technological University of the Philippines alumni